Amaranthaceae is a family of flowering plants commonly known as the amaranth family, in reference to its type genus Amaranthus. It includes the former goosefoot family Chenopodiaceae and contains about 165 genera and 2,040 species, making it the most species-rich lineage within its parent order, Caryophyllales.

Description

Vegetative characters

Most species in the Amaranthaceae are annual or perennial herbs or subshrubs; others are shrubs; very few species are vines or trees. Some species are succulent. Many species have stems with thickened nodes. The wood of the perennial stem has a typical "anomalous" secondary growth; only in subfamily Polycnemoideae is secondary growth normal.

The leaves are simple and mostly alternate, sometimes opposite. They never possess stipules. They are flat or terete, and their shape is extremely variable, with entire or toothed margins. In some species, the leaves are reduced to minute scales. In most cases, neither basal nor terminal aggregations of leaves occur.

Inflorescence and flowers

The flowers are solitary or aggregated in cymes, spikes, or panicles and typically perfect (bisexual) and actinomorphic. Some species have unisexual flowers. Bracts and bracteoles are either herbaceous or scarious. Flowers are regular with an herbaceous or scarious perianth of (one to) mostly five (rarely to eight) tepals, often joined. One to five stamens are opposite to tepals or alternating, inserting from a hypogynous disc, which may have appendages (pseudostaminodes) in some species. The anthers have two or four pollen sacs (locules). In tribe Caroxyloneae, anthers have vesicular appendages. The pollen grains are spherical with many pores (pantoporate), with pore numbers from a few to 250 (in Froelichia). One to three (rarely six) carpels are fused to a superior ovary with one (rarely two) basal ovule. Idioblasts are found in the tissues.

Fruits and seeds
The diaspores are seeds or fruits (utricles), more often the perianth persists and is modified in fruit for means of dispersal. Sometimes even bracts and bracteoles may belong to the diaspore. More rarely the fruit is a circumscissile capsule or a berry. The horizontal or vertical seed often has a thickened or woody seed coat. The green or white embryo is either spirally (and without perisperm) or annular (rarely straight).

Chromosome number
The basic chromosome number is (rarely 6) mostly 8–9 (rarely 17).

Phytochemistry
Widespread in the Amaranthaceae is the occurrence of betalain pigments. The former Chenopodiaceae often contain isoflavonoids.

In phytochemical research, several methylenedioxyflavonols, saponins, triterpenoids, ecdysteroids, and specific root-located carbohydrates have been found in these plants.

Photosynthesis pathway
Although most of the family use the more common  photosynthesis pathway, around 800 species are  plants; this makes the Amaranthaceae the largest group with this photosynthesis pathway among the eudicots (which collectively includes about 1,600  species). Within the family, several types of  photosynthesis occur, and about 17 different types of leaf anatomy are realized. Therefore, this photosynthesis pathway seems to have developed about 15 times independently during the evolution of the family. About two-thirds of the  species belong to the former Chenopodiaceae. The first occurrence of  photosynthesis dates from the early Miocene, about 24 million years ago, but in some groups, this pathway evolved much later, about 6 (or less) million years ago.

The multiple origin of  photosynthesis in the Amaranthaceae is regarded as an evolutionary response to inexorably decreasing atmospheric  levels, coupled with a more recent permanent shortage in water supply as well as high temperatures. Species with higher water-use efficiency had a selective advantage and were able to spread out into arid habitats.

Distribution
Amaranthaceae is a widespread and cosmopolitan family from the tropics to cool temperate regions. The Amaranthaceae (sensu stricto) are predominantly tropical, whereas the former Chenopodiaceae have their centers of diversity in dry temperate and warm temperate areas. Many of the species are halophytes, tolerating salty soils, or grow in dry steppes or semi-deserts.

Economic importance
Some species, such as spinach (Spinacia oleracea) or forms of beet (Beta vulgaris) (beetroot, chard), are used as vegetables. Forms of Beta vulgaris include fodder beet (Mangelwurzel) and sugar beet. The seeds of Amaranthus, lamb's quarters (Chenopodium berlandieri), quinoa (Chenopodium quinoa) and kañiwa (Chenopodium pallidicaule) are edible and are used as pseudocereals.

Dysphania ambrosioides (epazote) and Dysphania anthelmintica are used as medicinal herbs. Several amaranth species are also used indirectly as a source of soda ash, such as members of the genus Salicornia (see glasswort).

A number of species are popular garden ornamental plants, especially species from the genera Alternanthera, Amaranthus, Celosia, and Iresine. Other species are considered weeds, e.g., redroot pigweed (Amaranthus retroflexus) and alligatorweed (Alternanthera philoxeroides), and several are problematic invasive species, particularly in North America, including Kali tragus and Bassia scoparia. Many species are known to cause pollen allergies.

Systematics

In the APG IV system of 2016, as in the previous Angiosperm Phylogeny Group classifications, the family is placed in the order Caryophyllales and includes the plants formerly treated as the family Chenopodiaceae. The monophyly of this broadly defined Amaranthaceae has been strongly supported by both morphological and phylogenetic analyses.

The family Amaranthaceae was first published in 1789 by Antoine Laurent de Jussieu in Genera Plantarum, p. 87–88. The first publication of family Chenopodiaceae was in 1799 by Étienne Pierre Ventenat in Tableau du Regne Vegetal, 2, p. 253. The older name has priority and is now the valid scientific name of the extended Amaranthaceae (s.l. = sensu lato).

Some publications still continued to use the family name Chenopodiaceae. Phylogenetic research revealed the important impact of the subfamily Polycnemoideae on the classification (see cladogram): if Polycnemoideae are considered a part of Chenopodiaceae, then Amaranthaceae (s.str. = sensu stricto) have to be included, too, and the name of the extended family is Amaranthaceae. If Polycnemoideae would be separated as its own family, Chenopodiaceae and Amaranthaceae (s.str.) would form two distinct monophyletic groups and could be treated as two separate families.

Amaranthaceae  (s.l.) includes the former families Achyranthaceae , Atriplicaceae , Betaceae , Blitaceae , Celosiaceae , Chenopodiaceae  nom. cons., Corispermaceae , Deeringiaceae , Dysphaniaceae  nom. cons., Gomphrenaceae , Polycnemaceae , Salicorniaceae , Salsolaceae , and Spinaciaceae .

The systematics of Amaranthaceae are the subject of intensive recent research. Molecular genetic studies revealed the traditional classification, based on morphological and anatomical characters, often did not reflect the phylogenetic relationships.

The former Amaranthaceae (in their narrow circumscription) are classified into two subfamilies, Amaranthoideae and Gomphrenoideae, and contain about 65 genera and 900 species in tropical Africa and North America. The Amaranthoideae and some genera of Gomphrenoideae were found to be polyphyletic, so taxonomic changes are needed.

Current studies classified the species of former Chenopodiaceae to eight distinct subfamilies (the research is not yet completed): Polycnemoideae, which are regarded as a basal lineage, Betoideae, Camphorosmoideae, Chenopodioideae, Corispermoideae, Salicornioideae, Salsoloideae, and Suaedoideae. In this preliminary classification, the Amaranthaceae s.l. are divided into 10 subfamilies with approximately 180 genera and 2,500 species.

Genera
A short synoptic list of genera is given here. For further and more detailed information, see the subfamily pages.

References

External links
 
 
The family Amaranthaceae at APWebsite.
 Genera of Amaranthaceae at Germplasm Resources Information Network (USDA)
 
 
 Amaranthaceae at Tropicos
 Amaranthaceae in BoDD – Botanical Dermatology Database
 IUCN link: Amaranthaceae threatened species
 Stanley L. Welsh, Clifford W. Crompton & Steven E. Clemants (2003): Chenopodiaceae in Flora of North America 
 Kenneth R. Robertson & Steven E. Clemants (2003): Amaranthaceae in Flora of North America
  Gelin Zhu, Sergei L. Mosyakin & Steven E. Clemants (2003): Chenopodiaceae in Flora of China
 Bojian Bao, Thomas Borsch & Steven E. Clemants (2003): Amaranthaceae in Flora of China

 
Caryophyllales families